Two ships of the Indian Navy have been named INS Karwar:

 , a  the former HMS Overton acquired in 1956 and decommissioned in 1981
 , a  commissioned in 1986 and decommissioned in 2017

Indian Navy ship names